Christina Weiss Lurie is a documentary producer, philanthropist and minority owner of the NFL’s Philadelphia Eagles. Weiss Lurie is president of the Eagles Youth Partnership, the team's charitable foundation, and co-founder of three independent film companies- Vox3 Films, Tango Pictures and Screen Pass Pictures.

Early life and education 
Lurie was born to a secular Jewish family in Mexico City, the daughter of Lisa and Stanley Weiss. Weiss Lurie holds both United States and Mexican citizenship. She has one brother, Anthony. She moved to London at the age of ten. She attended and graduated from Yale University with a double major in theater and history of art.  She then continued her study at the  Webber Douglas Academy of Dramatic Art in England, where she dropped out to "discover the world." Afterwards, she moved to Paris. Interested in pursuing a career in cinema, Weiss Lurie next headed to Los Angeles where she worked for Aspect Ratio's Ron Molder, heading his independent film production company that produced I Love You to Death in 1990.

Philadelphia Eagles ownership 
In 1994, Weiss Lurie partnered with her then husband Jeffrey Lurie for the purchase of the Eagles from Norman Braman.  Weiss Lurie has spearheaded the franchise's philanthropic and sustainability efforts and also contributed to the design of Lincoln Financial Field and the NovaCare Complex – the Eagles’ corporate headquarters and training facility. She was instrumental in changing the Eagles' colors from the traditional kelly green and recreating the logo.

Eagles Youth Partnership and other philanthropy 
In 1995, she founded the Eagles Youth Partnership (EYP), the Eagles charitable arm. EYP focuses on literacy, vision, and after-school programs. EYP provides eye exams, glasses, and books to over 50,000 low-income children annually in the Greater Philadelphia region through its Eagles Eye Mobile and Eagles Book Mobile. In 2013, Weiss Lurie helped to launch the Tackling Breast Cancer campaign, a partnership between the Philadelphia Eagles and the Thomas Jefferson University Hospital Breast Care Center with all proceeds from the sale of pink Eagles merchandise being donated to the center.

Weiss Lurie serves on the board of the Curtis Institute of Music in Philadelphia. In 2007, Weiss Lurie helped to establish the Lurie Family Foundation which focused on autism and cancer research. She is also a member of the Council on Foreign Relations.

Sustainability 
Weiss Lurie is a strong promoter of the Eagles Go Green Campaign launched in 2003. Go Green is a private initiative to improve the environment by promoting programs that "improve the quality of life in the Philadelphia region, green the environment and reduce the team’s impact on the planet." As part of the initiative, the Eagles use solar power at both of their facilities; have taken steps to reduce their energy consumption and trash output on game days; and plant trees to offset the team's carbon emissions. EYP's Tackling Breast Cancer and Go Green initiatives earned the team the "2011 Sport Team of the Year" award from Beyond Sport, a global organization that promotes, develops and funds the use of sports to create positive social change across the world. Weiss Lurie is a member of the NFL's Green Club working group, a committee of club and league staff members who help determine and direct the league's environmental initiative.

Film and television 
In 2004, Weiss Lurie co-founded independent film producer Vox3 Films.  She served as executive producer on Adam and Rage, along with past productions America Brown, Game 6, Feel, Broken English and Never Forever. Fur, starring Nicole Kidman, was also a Vox3 Film production.
She established documentary film  company Screen Pass Pictures with her business partner and husband Jeffrey Lurie in conjunction with the Lurie Family Foundation. Under the Screen Pass Pictures banner, Weiss Lurie served as executive producer for Sergio (2009), Inside Job (2010), Inocente (2012), A Place at the Table (2013), and We Are The Giant (2014). Inside Job earned an Oscar for Best Documentary (Feature); Inocente, won an Oscar for Best Documentary (Short). In 2011, Weiss Lurie co-launched Tango Pictures which focused on producing mainstream films; also in 2011, she partnered with Alan Barnette to develop both scripted and unscripted television shows.

Personal life 
In a pre-production meeting for I Love You To Death, Weiss met Jeffrey Lurie (grandson of theater owner Philip Smith); they married in 1992 in Gstaad, Switzerland. They had two children: a son Julian and a daughter Milena. Weiss speaks three languages fluently: Spanish, French (her mother's native tongue), and English; she also speaks passable German and Italian. Although ethnically Jewish, she feels closest to Buddhism and celebrates both Passover and Christmas with her children. In 2012, the couple announced that they were divorcing; the divorce was finalized in August 2012. She received a "sizeable" ownership interest in the Philadelphia Eagles as part of the divorce settlement.

Weiss Lurie is a contemporary art collector.

Filmography 
Christina Weiss Lurie on IMDb

Awards 
In 2005, EYP received the inaugural Steve Patterson award for Excellence in Sports Philanthropy.
In 2008, the Go Green Campaign won the Ongoing Commitment Award from the Environmental Media Association.  In 2009, the Eagles received the Sustainability Award from PA Environmental Council.

In 2010, Weiss Lurie was a recipient of Drexel University's LeBow College of Business Leaders of the Year award. In 2010, the Eagles received worldwide recognition as one of three finalists in the sports world for Beyond Sport's “Sport Team of the Year", earning the team the award in 2011.

References 

Year of birth missing (living people)
Living people
People from Mexico City
Yale University alumni
Philadelphia Eagles owners
American people of Mexican descent
Mexican Jews
Jewish American sportspeople
Smith family (theaters)